Sylvie Brunet (born 12 March 1959) is a French politician of the Democratic Movement (MoDem) who was elected as a Member of the European Parliament in 2019.

Political career
In parliament, Brunet has been serving on the Committee on Employment and Social Affairs since 2019.

In addition to her committee assignments, Brunet is part of the Parliament's delegations for relations with Palestine and to the Parliamentary Assembly of the Union for the Mediterranean. She is also a member of the European Parliament Intergroup on Seas, Rivers, Islands and Coastal Areas; the European Parliament Intergroup on Trade Unions; the European Parliament Intergroup on the Welfare and Conservation of Animals; and the MEPs Against Cancer group.

From 2019 until 2021, Brunet served as deputy chair of the Renew Europe parliamentary group, under the leadership of chair Dacian Cioloș.

Plenary Debates 
Mental health in the digital world of work was a plenary debate that had the input and response of Sylvie Brunet. Sylvie Brunet's views on the matter consisted of her belief that the COVID-19 pandemic has increased mental health issues in the work environment, because of the reliability needed for digital media. Sylvie Brunet believes that this issue is not inevitable, and overtime it can be resolved. Sylvie Brunet has the viewpoint that we must take in account all possible causes of mental health issues from the digital environment, in order to have a clean resolution.

Women's poverty in Europe was another plenary debate that had the response of Sylvie Brunet. Sylvie Brunet believes that poverty for both men and women is ongoing situation and issue in Europe, and that more female dominated jobs are a key factor to the growth of the economy for women's jobs.

Global threats to abortion rights was another debate that had responded views from Sylvie Brunet. Sylvie Brunet's own opinion resides with the choice that women can decide for their own bodies, on the topic of abortion. Sylvie Brunet posed the question towards the end of her statement, addressing a point of view about all the women who have been violated or in poverty because of their ability to not decide for themselves in terms of their choice for abortion.

Women in politics was a plenary debate that Sylvie Brunet was involved in. Sylvie Brunet believes that many harassments that are targeted towards women in politics are in the majority taking place in the digital social world. Sylvie Brunet wants to ensure that the harassment of females in politics ceases, and the stereotypes of a male dominated political role should fade away. Brunet wants women to be able to have access and availability to many digital media without having the fear of being violated through violence and negative comments because of their political roles or views.

Specific measures to address the COVID-19 crisis was a plenary debate that had the input of Sylvie Brunet. The COVID-19 pandemic caused many issues and damage to the economy of Europe, Brunet believes that it must be addressed to find new solutions to help restore the financial status of Europe, including the mental health issues of others that relates to the plenary debate of mental health in the digital world of work.

A social Europe in a digital world is a plenary debate that a response from Sylvie Brunet. Sylvie Brunet's input had the viewpoint that the digital media has evolved greatly over the course of the years, as technology has gotten better. Brunet's main concern and subject in the debate was her view on how many new establishments and corporations have been established on the media world, meaning for jobs being digitally available as well, with all the new items and ideas being given by the media, also comes with the difficulty of keeping everything in check for legislators, which is what Brunet had to say.

In her career in her involvement in main parliamentary activities, Sylvie Brunet has contributed to reports on fair working treatment and conditions for workers throughout Europe, specifically platform workers. The reports dived into the possibility of employment becoming increased in digital formats.

Contributions to plenary debates have allowed Sylvie Brunet to become more established in her role as a politician, especially in the idea of renewing Europe to a more successful and healthy period.

References

1959 births
Living people
MEPs for France 2019–2024
21st-century women MEPs for France
Democratic Movement (France) MEPs
European Democratic Party MEPs
People from Versailles
Politicians from Île-de-France